Meenakshi Wadhwa is a planetary scientist and educator who studies the formation and evolution of the Solar System through the analysis of planetary materials including meteorites, Moon rocks and other extraterrestrial samples returned by spacecraft missions. She is director of the School of Earth and Space Exploration at Arizona State University. She is also a research associate at Field Museum of Natural History in Chicago.

Career

Meenakshi Wadhwa received her Ph.D. in Earth and Planetary Sciences in 1994 from Washington University in St. Louis. She was a postdoctoral research geochemist at University of California, San Diego (1994–95), and then became Curator of meteorites at Field Museum of Natural History (1995-2006). She served as director of the Center for Meteorite Studies at Arizona State University from 2006 till 2019, where she oversaw the curation of one of the largest university-based meteorite collections, and a variety of research and educational activities. She was appointed as director of ASU's School of Earth and Space Exploration as of July 1, 2019. She has searched for meteorites in Antarctica with the Antarctic Search for Meteorites (ANSMET) Program during two field seasons (2002–03 and 2012–13). She has served as a science team member on a number of NASA planetary science missions including Genesis and Mars Science Laboratory. She was PI of a proposal for Sample Collection for the Investigation of Mars (SCIM) to the NASA Discovery program in 2010.

Awards and honors
In 1999 she was awarded the asteroid name 8356 Wadhwa by the International Astronomical Union (IAU). She was awarded the Nier Prize in 2000, a Guggenheim Fellowship in 2005, and the J. Lawrence Smith Medal by the National Academy of Sciences in 2021. Wadhwa is an elected fellow of the Meteoritical Society (2006), the Explorers Club (2012), the American Geophysical Union (2019), and the Geochemical Society (2021).

References

External links
 Meenakshi Wadhwa on her Career, Women in Science and Spending Four Months in a Wheelchair
 The Woman Who Gets Called When a Piece of Mars Falls from the Sky
 Meenakshi Wadhwa’s Arizona State University School of Earth & Space Exploration webpage

Living people
Planetary scientists
American people of Indian descent
American women astronomers
Women planetary scientists
Arizona State University faculty
Fellows of the Explorers Club
Year of birth missing (living people)
Fellows of the American Geophysical Union
Washington University in St. Louis alumni
Panjab University alumni